Saarnaki laid is an uninhabited, moraine-based island in the Baltic Sea belonging to the country of Estonia.
 
Saarnaki laid is a relatively young island; it rose from the Baltic Sea approximately 2,000 years ago. It lies just off the southeastern coast of the island of Hiiumaa, and is administrated by Hiiu County.

Saarnaki laid had previously been inhabited at least since the early 15th-century and was abandoned by the last residents in 1973. It is the largest of the islands that make up the Hiiumaa Islets Landscape Reserve (Estonian: Hiiumaa laidude maastikukaitseala) and several former residential and farm buildings on the island have been restored for the benefit of tourists.

Gallery

See also
 List of islands of Estonia

References

External links
 Sakala:Saarnaki — laid täis lambaid ja kadakaid (in Estonian)

Uninhabited islands of Estonia
Hiiumaa Parish
Estonian islands in the Baltic
Landforms of Hiiu County